Unión Deportiva Guía is a Spanish football club based in Santa María de Guía, Gran Canaria, in the Canary Islands. Founded in 1958, it plays in Preferente Interinsular – Group 2, holding home games at Estadio Octavio Estevez de Guía de Gran Canaria, with a capacity of 1,000 people.

Season to season

2 seasons in Tercera División

References

External links
Official website 
Fútbol Regional team profile 
Soccerway team profile

Football clubs in the Canary Islands
Association football clubs established in 1958
1958 establishments in Spain